Alfred Cumming (September 4, 1802 – October 9, 1873) was an American politician who served as the governor of the Utah Territory from April 12, 1858, to May 17, 1861. Cumming succeeded Brigham Young as governor following the Utah War.

Career
A Democrat, Cumming was appointed governor of the Utah Territory by President James Buchanan. He served as governor until 1861 and returned to Washington, D.C. 

Cumming also served as mayor of Augusta, Georgia, sutler to Zachary Taylor during the Mexican War, and superintendent of the Upper Missouri Indian Superintendency.

Personal life
He was born in Augusta, Georgia. His wife, Elizabeth Randall Cumming, died in 1867. He was the brother of Henry Harford Cumming and the uncle of Alfred Cumming.

References

1802 births
1873 deaths
Governors of Utah Territory
Mayors of Augusta, Georgia
People from Augusta, Georgia
Utah Democrats
People of the Utah War
Descendants of Samuel Adams